Sari Chabab Djil Aïn Defla, known as SC Aïn Defla  or simply SCAD for short, is an Algerian football club based in Aïn Defla. The club was founded in 1934 and its colours are white and black. Their home stadium, Abdelkader Khellal Stadium, has a capacity of 8,000 spectators. The club is currently playing in the Inter-Régions Division.

History 
On August 5, 2020, SC Aïn Defla promoted to the Algerian Ligue 2.

References

Football clubs in Algeria